Miodrag Stošić (Serbian Cyrillic: Миодраг Стошић; born 25 February 1981) is a Serbian professional footballer who plays as a defender.

Career
Stošić represented Loznica, Radnički Obrenovac and Vojvodina in his homeland, before moving to France in the summer of 2009. He stayed the following five years in the country, playing for Nîmes and Laval, before returning to Serbia by joining Voždovac in the summer of 2014.

External links
 
 Srbijafudbal profile 
 

Association football defenders
Championnat National players
Expatriate footballers in France
FK Loznica players
FK Radnički Obrenovac players
FK Vojvodina players
FK Voždovac players
Ligue 2 players
Nîmes Olympique players
Sportspeople from Loznica
Serbian expatriate footballers
Serbian expatriate sportspeople in France
Serbian footballers
Serbian SuperLiga players
Stade Lavallois players
1981 births
Living people